Bok bok may refer to:
a band Bok Bok formed by Steve Garvey in 1980
 a band Bok Bok formed by Alex Sushon around 2003
Bok bok sing